Jan Marinus Jongkind (19 September 1932, Aalsmeer) was a sailor from the Netherlands, who represented his country at the 1964 Summer Olympics in Enoshima. Jonkind, as crew (Race 1 - 2) on the Dutch Dragon took the 13th place with helmsman Wim van Duyl, fellow crew member Henny Scholtz and Dick Wayboer (Race 3 - 7).

Before his Dragon period Jongkind sailed at a high level in the Flying Dutchman. From 1968 - 1969 Jongkind sailed the Soling.

Jongkind is one of the first sailmakers who successfully used Dacron as base material for modern racing sails.

Ban from International regattas
During the Olympic regatta of 1964 a controversy emerged between the team members (Van Duyl & Jongkind) of the Dutch Dragon. This escalated and Jongkind left Japan after the second race. After the Games the Royal Dutch Yacht Racing Union ruled that because of their behavior, both team members were not allowed to sail in International regattas for the next two years.

Sources

 
 
 
 
 

Living people
1932 births
People from Aalsmeer
Dutch male sailors (sport)
Flying Dutchman class sailors
Sailors at the 1964 Summer Olympics – Dragon
Olympic sailors of the Netherlands
Sailmakers
Sportspeople from North Holland
20th-century Dutch people